The Missoula All Maggots RFC or the Missoula Maggots are an amateur Rugby football club based out of Missoula Montana. The Maggots were established in 1976 by former University of Montana rugby club players recently graduated from the  University of Montana in Missoula. The Maggots play competitive Rugby Union and Rugby Sevens versions of Rugby within the Montana Rugby Union which is affiliated with USA Rugby. The Maggots are traditionally a Rugby Union style team when they are in competition as the popularity of Rugby Sevens is much newer to Rugby overall. The Maggots also play against other Division I, Division II, and Division III men's and collegiate rugby clubs throughout the Pacific Northwest, United States, and Canada when not committed to Montana Rugby Union play. The Maggots are known to tour much more than other rugby clubs in the United States. The Maggots frequently take rugby road tours using their infamous club Maggotbus to domestic and Canadian locations. As of the Spring of 2023 the Maggots are on their fifth Maggotbus since their founding in 1976. The Maggots typically tour several times each year across Western US states and Western Canada. In Maggot history the team has taken international tours to the Cayman Islands, New Zealand (3 occasions), Japan, England (2 occasions), France, Australia, and Ireland. Team colors are black and white. As of Spring 2023, The Maggots have 26 Montana Rugby Union titles since the Union was founded 47 years ago in 1977.

Maggotfest
The Maggots are also the host of the Annual Maggotfest social rugby festival in Missoula which has been going on annually since 1977. Maggotfest annually attracts teams from throughout the United States, Canada, and the World to come and partake in its unique social rugby festival offering. Teams from England, Wales, France, New Zealand, and Australia have come to participate in Maggotfest on many occasions over the festivals years in action. The non-elimination rugby match style festival focuses on the fun, social, and bonding aspects of the game as well as emphasizing competitive rugby gameplay and sportsmanship as well. The Maggotfest rugby festival currently hosts up to 48 Rugby Union teams and over 2,000+ individuals come annually to play or simply just join the fun and wild festivities every year. Maggotfest has strong Rugby Union participant loyalty as a majority attending come year after year for the annual festival. There are men's, old boys, and women's divisions, with teams of several varying rugby skill levels.

See also 
Hellgate Roller Derby
Missoula PaddleHeads

References

External links 
 USA Rugby
 Montana Rugby Union

American rugby union teams
Sports in Missoula, Montana
1976 establishments in Montana
Rugby union in Montana
Rugby clubs established in 1976